SLLP may refer to:

El Alto International Airport, for which the ICAO code is SLLP
San Lazaro Leisure Park, a horse racing park in Carmona, Cavite in the Philippines
Sri Lanka Labour Party, a political party in Sri Lanka
Superficial layer LP in vocal folds
Specialized language for linguistic programming